The Men's ski halfpipe competition at the FIS Freestyle Ski and Snowboarding World Championships 2019 was held on February 7 and 9, 2019.

Qualification
The qualification was started on February 7, at 13:30. The best ten skiers qualified for the final.

Final
The final was started on February 9, at 19:00.

References

Men's ski halfpipe